Rizomylos (Greek: Ριζόμυλος meaning rice mill) is a village in the municipal unit of Diakopto, Achaea, Greece. Its beach on the Gulf of Corinth, 2 km northeast of the village, is well known. Aigio is 6 km to the northwest, and the village Nea Keryneia is adjacent to the west. The Greek National Road 8A (Patras - Corinth) passes south of the village. In 2011, Rizomylos had a population of 366 inhabitants.

Population

External links
 Rizomylos GTP Travel Pages
 Rizomylos on www.ediakopto.gr

See also

List of settlements in Achaea

References

Aigialeia
Diakopto
Populated places in Achaea